RFNS Kacau is a hydrographic survey vessel donated by China to the Republic of Fiji Naval Service in 2019.  With the capacity for approximately 30 crewmembers she will be Fiji's largest vessel.

Kacau is a catamaran, and has a deck area that can accommodate deck cargo and standard sized shipping containers.

References

Naval ships of Fiji